Wissam Toubal (born 18 January 1984) is an Algerian chess player who holds the FIDE title of Woman International Master (WIM, 2005).

Biography
Toubal participated in World Youth Chess Championships in various age groups. In 2001, in Cairo she won bronze medal in African Women's Chess Championship. In 2001, she participated in Women's World Chess Championship by knock-out system and in the first round lost to Alisa Galliamova. In 2003, Toubal played for Algeria in All-Africa Games chess tournament and won team and individual gold medals. In 2005, she won 3rd place in the Women's World Chess Championship Africa Zonal tournament.

She played for Algeria in the Women's Chess Olympiads:
 In 2002, at first reserve board in the 35th Chess Olympiad (women) in Bled (+1, =2, -2).
 In 2006, at first board in the 37th Chess Olympiad (women) in Turin (+6, =0, -6).

In 2005, Toubal was awarded the FIDE Woman International Master (WIM) title.

References

External links
 
 
 

1984 births
Living people
Algerian female chess players
Chess Woman International Masters
Chess Olympiad competitors
African Games medalists in chess
Competitors at the 2003 All-Africa Games
African Games gold medalists for Algeria
21st-century Algerian women
20th-century Algerian women